Robert Montgomery (born  1972) is a Scottish-born, London-based poet, artist and sculptor known for his site-specific installations created from light and text, as well as his 'fire poems'. Montgomery works in a "melancholic post-Situationist" tradition, primarily in public spaces. He is regarded as a leading figure in the conceptual art world.

Some of his most famous public forms of poetry have been his white text on a black background pasted onto billboards around London as part of his belief that art and poetry should be taken out of the gallery and into the wider, everyday world be it on a billboard or a bus shelter. When asked by Dr James Fox in BBC Four's Who's Afraid of Conceptual Art? about what it was about the medium of words, rather than pictures that appealed to him, Montgomery replied "I think there's a certain slowness to words. I think we probably live in an age of accelerated image and we're bombarded with hundreds of images a day and in that context words can be a moment of quiet or pause."

He said, "The point of art, is to touch the hearts of strangers, without the trouble of ever having to meet them. But, if you can touch their hearts from a distance and help a little bit from your quiet studio then it's very nice."

Early career and education 
Robert Montgomery was born in 1972 in the village of Chapelhall, Scotland, to David and Janette Montgomery.

Alongside his parents, Montgomery credits his secondary school art teacher John McKerrell for his interest in art. In an interview he said that "John McKerrell was a proper Dead Poets Society inspiring, amazing teacher who is kind of a genius...he taught me about art from top to bottom. He comes to my parents' house for Christmas dinner. He's still my best mate in Prestwick."

Another teacher was Enoch Currie, who introduced him to poets such as Sylvia Plath and Ted Hughes. Montgomery recalls reading Philip Larkin's High Windows "when I was in third year and I still think a lot about the way Larkin writes when I write my billboards and text pieces."

Aged 16, Montgomery was accepted to study fine art at the Edinburgh College of Art.

Montgomery left with a first undergraduate degree in painting and later obtained a Master of Fine Arts. While still students he and John Ayscough applied for a grant from the Scottish Arts Council for their project, Aerial '94. They were awarded £40,000, but the grant was not intended for students, and was nearly withdrawn. Andrew Nairne (then Visual Director at the Scottish Arts Council) supported the aspiring artists, and as a result the project went forward with the help of the grant.

From 1995 to 1997, Montgomery was the Core Program Artist in Residence at the Museum of Fine Arts in Houston Texas.

In his early career, Montgomery experimented with creating minimalist sculptures with elaborate poetic titles. Eventually, Montgomery dropped the sculptures all together and began to focus on the combination of verbal and visual presentation. In his initial works, Montgomery wrote poems on the sides of buses and on walls with spray paint, wanting to follow closely in the footsteps of graffiti artists who made the city a "free space of diverse voices."

In 1999, Montgomery moved to London, where he wrote for the magazine Dazed & Confused.

Work 

Often installed unauthorised amid industrial and urban sites, Montgomery's installations address themes such as power, love, and human kindness with sparse language and dramatic visuals. These text-based conceptual pieces categorised as recycled sunlight pieces, billboard pieces, fire poems, woodcut panels, and watercolors. Montgomery's cryptic and emotionally resonant poetry comments on contemporary life and affirms his personal and philosophical beliefs, which he describes as "melancholic post-Situationist", a 20th-century antiauthoritarian Marxist movement.

Montgomery's black and white poems pasted on London billboards have, occasionally, provoked run-ins with the police. He was once put into the back of a police van after he pasted his poem for William Blake on a billboard in Bethnal Green. Montgomery recalled; "But I got into a conversation about literature and one of the police officers really engaged with it. I guess it was a lucky experience. I think most people wouldn't be averse to having a poem at the end of street instead of another Diet Coke ad."

Montgomery showed at the 2011 Venice Biennale and was selected to represent the UK at the first biennale in India - The Kochi-Muziris Biennale – in December 2012. He has also had solo exhibitions at venues in Europe and in Asia, including major outdoor light installations on the site of the old US Air Force base at Tempelhof. The first monograph of his work was published by Distanz, Berlin in 2015.

Process and inspiration 
Montgomery was initially inspired by the graffiti artists of East London, the poetry of Philip Larkin, the philosophy of Guy Debord, and the French student protesters of May 1968. Montgomery became interested in the Situationist tradition while following the writing of Roland Barthes and Jean Baudrillard during his time at Edinburgh College of Art. Montgomery also cites lyricists as important influencers, as his poems often mirror the tone and structure commonly used by songwriters. Montgomery describes his process as being random and unpredictable: "You quite often get stuff at like 2 o'clock in the morning and kind of see what you've got. I quite like that process". In selecting a platform for his art, Montgomery was inspired by Jenny Holzer and Felix Gonzalez-Torres' use of billboard space.

In early 2016, Montgomery became a supporter for Julius Meinl with their 'Pay with a Poem' concept for World Poetry Day, whereby customers could, for one day only, have coffee at one of their branches and instead of money could pay for it by writing a poem; encouraging them to think about poetry as a form of self expression.

Publications 
Robert Montgomery's Echos of Voices in the High Towers was published by Mono Kultur in 2012. The Book is A2 in size, folding out to A1 in size, divided into three parts, and serves as a complete publication of Montgomery's work.

On first arriving in London, Montgomery became involved in the monthly style magazine Dazed & Confused, a magazine where he is still an associate publisher.

in 2016, Montgomery and his partner, Greta Bellamacina, launched their own publishing company called New River Press, dedicated to pushing the boundaries of what poetry means today particularly for a younger audience "we want to launch a place for poetry that doesn't exist yet.".

Exhibitions 
Montgomery's work has been featured in a variety of galleries, publications, and public locations. His work is in the permanent collection at the Museum of Fine Arts in Houston Texas and the Anna Jill Lupertz Gallery in Berlin.

Personal life 
Montgomery lives in London. He prefers to spend his time in cities, transferring between London, Paris, New York, and Berlin.

After being in a long-term relationship with frequent collaborator and fellow poet Greta Bellamacina, the two married in July 2017. To celebrate, Montgomery created a wedding fire poem which read, "SALVAGE PARADISE. LOVE IS THE WEATHER. DAYDREAMS FOREVER" before being set alight. Likewise, Bellamacina wrote him a fire poem reading "ETERNAL WINDOW HYMNS". The two met when Bellamacina was editing a book of love poetry and put one of Montgomery's poems in the book. She later said that "it was refreshing to meet someone through their words, you can find out a lot about the person." In 2015, Bellamacina gave birth to their first child, a son, Lorca. In 2019, she gave birth to their second child, Lucian Valentine Swan.

See also 
 Situationist International
 Visual poetry
 Martin Firrell

References

External links 
 

Scottish sculptors
Scottish contemporary artists
Scottish male sculptors
Alumni of the Edinburgh College of Art
Living people
1970s births
Year of birth uncertain